Skousen is a surname of Danish origin. Notable people with the surname include:

W. Cleon Skousen (1913–2006), American writer, defender of the John Birch Society
Greer Skousen (1916–1988), Mexican-American basketball player
Joel Skousen (born 1946), American writer and survivalist
Mark Skousen (born 1947), American economist
Royal Skousen (born 1945), American professor and Book of Mormon expert

See also
Skouson Harker, Canadian basketball player and coach